Life in Your Glass World is the fourth studio album by American rock band Citizen. The album was released on March 26, 2021 through Run for Cover Records.

Style and composition 
The album has been described by music journalists as emo, post-hardcore, post-punk, shoegazing, experimental rock, and indie rock.

Critical reception 

Life in Your Glass World received generally positive reviews from contemporary music critics. On review aggregator website, Metacritic, the album has average rating of 72 out of 100 indicating "generally favorable reviews". 

Joe Smith, writing for The Line of Best Fit, described the album as a "a brave and rewarding return from emo experimentalists Citizen". Smith further said "each track holds its own distinct mood, along with the signature poised aggression that they've meticulously sculpted throughout their career". Smith awarded the album a 9 out of 10. Phoebe  De Angelis, writing for Upset Magazine gave the album a four-star rating out of five saying that Life in Your Glass World is Citizen's "most confident body of work to date."

In a mixed review, Joe Richardson, writing for Kerrang! gave Life in Your Glass World a three-star rating out of five. Richardson described the album as a "consistently rewarding listen", but conceded that the album "doesn't exactly shatter expectations".

Track listing

References

External links 
 Life in Your Glass World on Bandcamp

2021 albums
Citizen (band) albums
Run for Cover Records albums